Thomas Cecil Howitt, OBE (6 June 1889 - 3 September 1968) was a British provincial architect of the 20th Century. Howitt is chiefly remembered for designing prominent public buildings, such as the Council House and Processional Way in Nottingham, Baskerville House in Birmingham (first phase of the unrealised Civic Centre scheme), Newport Civic Centre, and several Odeon cinemas (such as Weston-super-Mare and Bristol). Howitt's chief architectural legacies are in his home city of Nottingham. He was Housing Architect for the City Council, designing municipal housing estates which are often considered to be among the finest in terms of planning in the country.

Early years
Howitt was born at Hucknall, near Nottingham and educated at Nottingham High School, leaving in 1904 to be apprenticed to the prominent Nottingham architect, Albert Nelson Bromley. Bromley was architect to the Nottingham School Board and did extensive work for the Boots Company. In 1907, Howitt studied briefly at the Architectural Association School in London. He later opened a London branch office for Bromley, before returning to the Nottingham office until 1913.

Following a study tour of Europe in early 1914, Howitt was invited to become the company architect for Boots, however, the war soon intervened. Howitt was commissioned in November 1914, rising to the rank of Lieutenant-Colonel in the Leicestershire Regiment. He was awarded the Distinguished Service Order and French Croix de Guerre, as well as a Chevalier of the Legion d'Honneur (for action at the Battle of the Marne). Howitt was demobilised with the rank of Major in October 1919, and joined the City Engineer's Department at Nottingham City Council.

Architectural career

In 1926, Howitt's rising status in the profession was marked by election as a member of the RIBA Council. The following year, he made a study tours of the US and Canada and in 1928 to Denmark and Sweden (where he saw Stockholm Town Hall-writing an article about it for the local Nottingham Guardian).

In 1928 he was appointed City Architect in Nottingham in succession to Arthur Dale, but he relinquished this position in 1930 in favour of Edward Phillips.

As work on the Council House came towards completion, Howitt wished to set up his own practice, and after being asked to stay in post until a suitable successor could be appointed, he established an office in Exchange Buildings in December 1930.

Major architectural works

Selected unbuilt designs
Civic Centre, Yeovil, Somerset (1938–39) - works cancelled by war.
Head Office, British Electricity Authority, Bramcote, Nottingham (1956)

Later years

Howitt was actively involved in RIBA matters during the 1950s; effectively leaving the practice in the hands of partners Philip Gerrard and Frederick Woolley. Indeed, the name of the practice was changed to Cecil Howitt & Partners in 1948. Howitt retired from architectural practice in April 1962.

Cecil Howitt died aged 79 in September 1968; in the house he designed for himself, The Cottage, Lombard Street, Orston, Nottinghamshire.

Sources

References

External links

Nottingham Civic Society: Comparing Nottingham Council House and the Stockholm City Hall (2004)

People from Hucknall
1968 deaths
1889 births
British Army personnel of World War I
Recipients of the Croix de Guerre 1914–1918 (France)
Chevaliers of the Légion d'honneur
Royal Leicestershire Regiment officers
People educated at Nottingham High School
Architects from Nottingham
20th-century English architects
Officers of the Order of the British Empire